Groundation is an American roots reggae band with jazz and dub influences, from Sonoma County in Northern California.  It is named for Rastafarian ceremony of Grounation.

History
Created in the fall of 1998 by Harrison Stafford, Groundation began on the campus of Sonoma State University's Jazz Program. Harrison formed the initial group by calling in bassist Ryan Newman, keyboardist Marcus Urani, and drummer Jason Bodlovitch who were fellow students under the Jazz Performance department. Between 1999 and 2001, Harrison Stafford taught the first course on the History of Reggae Music at the University. In 1999, Stafford teamed up with Kris Dilbeck to found Young Tree Records and release Groundation's debut album 'Young Tree. "Groundation" comes from the Rasta term "Grounation".

Grounation Day is an important Rastafarian holy day celebrated April 21, which commemorates Haile Selassie’s first visit to Jamaica in 1966. Grounation Day is second in importance to Coronation Day, which is celebrated November 2, in honor Haile Selassie’s Coronation in 1930.

In 1999, while in Jamaica, Harrison met the legendary engineer Jim Fox, who was involved with the production of many of RAS Records’ most iconic releases. Fox remastered both Young Tree and Each One Teach One and recorded Hebron Gate (2002), the album that launched Groundation to international acclaim. Fox has continued working with the band on every subsequent release, helping to shape their sound on We Free Again (2004), Upon The Bridge (2006), Here I Am (2009), Building An Ark (2012), and A Miracle (2014) creating a catalog of genre-bending, deep, progressive roots reggae music. Similarly, Groundation’s artwork had a consistent look and feel, in collaboration with Stafford's childhood friend, Giovanni Maki, creating all visual designs from the very beginning.

The band creates an altogether new reggae sound, featuring swirling, jazz/funk inspired horns, stout Latin and African based poly-rhythmics, and soulful harmony vocals. Their concerts utilize live improvisation, in classic jazz fashion, and are renowned for their high energy, communion-type atmosphere. Having gained international notoriety for their progressive fusion style, Groundation regularly plays at major international festivals like Summerjam.

The band uses analog instruments and recording equipment rather than digital, with Stafford explaining "No digital, we don't work with synthesisers. Just like in the 1970s we stick to that format."

Through the years, Groundation has performed in over 35 countries on 5 continents. The band, which had a number of personnel changes over the years, but always built around Harrison Stafford’s leadership, continued to bring reggae into new worlds, with their last studio album, The Next Generation (2018) opening with a full jazz big band (featuring 12 horn players). This album beat out Ziggy Marley and others to win Reggae.fr's “Best Roots Reggae Album of 2018,” voted on by over 16,000 media members, musicians, producers, and fans.

In 2022 GROUNDATION released their 10th studio album One Rock. The album can be seen as a product of the global pandemic of the last two years. During this period, Groundation became even more aware of the issues of selfishness and greed that have emerged, which they address throughout the record, while also paying tribute to the victims and honoring the many reggae legends who have left us too soon since 2020. The group's desire to honor the "veterans" on this album was therefore obvious. Always a group to respect their elders and forebears, Groundation makes history yet again by bringing together the legendary reggae vocal groups Israel Vibration, The Abyssinians, and The Congos into the fold for One Rock.

Lineup

Members
 Harrison Stafford – vocals, guitar
 Isaiah Palmer - Bass player 
 Zach Morillo - Drummer
 Brady Shammar - Harmony vocalist 
 Alreca Smith - Harmony vocalist
 Eduardo Gross - Guitarist 
 Roger Cox- Saxophone
 Matt Jenson - Keyboardist

Former members
 Marcus Urani – b3, keyboards
 Ryan Newman – bass
 David Chachere – trumpet
 Te Kenawa Haereiti aka. Rufus – drums
 Kim Pommell – chorus
 Sherida Sharpe – chorus
 Nicholas Daniel Wlodarczyk – trombone
 Jason Robinson – sax, flute
 Paul Spina – drums (from December 2001 to July 2008; credited as a guest on some more recent albums).
 James Stafford – drums (on the first two albums)
 Shawna Anderson – chorus (from 1999 to 2004)
 Adaria Armstrong – chorus (2004)
 Jeannine Guillory – chorus (2005)
 Ekua Impraim – chorus (2005)
 Ikesha Johnson – chorus (2006)
 Benjamin Krames – congas, timbales, percussion (in 2007, during Mingo's break)
 Kelsey Howard – trombone (from 2000–2012)
 Kerry-Ann Morgan – chorus (from 2006–2012)
 Mingo Lewis Jr. – congas, timbales, percussion (2003–2013)

Discography

 Studio albums 
1999: Young Tree (Remastered in 2002)
2001: Each One Teach One2002: Hebron Gate2004: We Free Again2005: Dub Wars2006: Upon the Bridge2008: Rockamovya (Groundation's Stafford, Newman, and Urani project featuring Will Bernard and Leroy "Horsemouth" Wallace),
2009: Here I Am2011: Gathering of the Elders2011: We Dub Again (Dub Remixes of We Free Again)
2012: Building an Ark2014: A Miracle2016: Each One Dub One2018: The Next Generation2020: The Next Generation Live''
2022:   One Rock

References

External links 

Young Tree Records official website
Groundation album reviews at Reggae-Reviews.com
Rockamovya official website
BB Organ official website

American reggae musical groups
Easy Star Records artists